Strange Journey may refer to:
 Strange Journey, a 1946 American film
 Strange Journey, a three-volume song album composed by CunninLynguists
Strange Journey Volume One
Strange Journey Volume Two
Strange Journey Volume Three
 Shin Megami Tensei: Strange Journey, a 2010 video game in the Megami Tensei series